Lamar Moore (born September 7, 1981 in Chicago, IL) is a celebrity chef and serves as an advocate and mentor, supporting youth transitioning into the culinary field.

Personal life 

Lamar Moore was born in Chicago, Illinois, he is the second oldest of four sons. Lamar has served as a mentor at “ProStart, a two-year educational program for teens through the National Restaurant Association, where he shares his culinary experience with local Chicago Public School students by conducting demonstrations and workshops.”  and he is an advocate for Youth within the Culinary Industry.

Career

As Reality TV Chef

Lamar used his Culinary skills for a social experiment on the show Welcome to Waverly
Lamar competed on "Chopped," showcasing his soon to be award winning burgers and Beat Bobby Flay, where he was eliminated in the first round.
Lamar made history winning Food Networks Vegas Prizefight competition to become the Executive Chef of the Flamingo Casionos Bugsey and Myers in July, 2020. He left that position four months later.

Giving Back 
Lamar partnered with World Kitchen to feed many during COVID-19
Lamar used his celebrity status to raise funds for Door Dash and RED's COVID-19 Relief fund

References 

Living people
People from Chicago
1981 births